Rida Lah Douliazale (born 3 September 1985) is a former Moroccan international footballer who played as a central midfielder.

Club career

Wydad Casablanca
When he was signed at Wydad his comments showed how important this was to him, " I always dreamed to have a place in the starting 11 of Wydad. Playing in a big club like Wydad is a honour for me". He played a game in the Botola 2006–07 with Wydad Casablanca that ended in a draw. In the Arab Champions League 2008-09 he scored two goals against Al-Taliya and Al Oruba Sur. In 73 appearances for Wydad, Rida Lah scored 23 goals, 0.3 goals per game. He is no longer with the club.

Kawkab Marrakech
Douliazale wore the number 5 during the Botola 2006-07 season on loan at Kawkab Marrakech.

In 15 appearances for Kawkab, Rida Lah scored 1 goal, 0.06 goals per game.

Seattle Sounders FC
He was on trial with the Seattle Sounders FC of the Major League Soccer. If Douliazale had joined the Sounders, he would have been the second player from Wydad Casablanca to join Major League Soccer since Khalil Azmi joined the Colorado Rapids in 1996.

Statistics

International career
Douliazale played for the Moroccan U-20 football team from 2004 to 2005 scoring 1 goal in 9 games.

He was selected for the 2005 FIFA World Youth Championship in the Netherlands and scored the goal against Spain in a 3–1 loss. He also gave an assist to Nabil El Zhar against Italy, the game ended as a 2–2 draw. In penalties, Douliazale missed the second penalty for Morocco. In 2006, he then played for the Moroccan U-23 football team he has yet to score a goal in 3 appearances. In four games Douliazale played a total of 230 minutes, 57.5 minutes per game. In the semi-final game against Nigeria, Douliazale was given a red card, he had already gotten a yellow card earlier in the game.

U-20 International Goals

Honours
Wydad Casablanca

Moroccan League (1)
Champion : 2006
Coupe du Trône (0)
Runner-up : 2004
Arab Champions League (0)
Runner-up : 2008, 2009

Moroccan U-20 National Team
FIFA World Youth Championship
Fourth Place : 2005

Personal
Douliazale started playing soccer at age four. He can also speak French and Arabic.

External links
 Rida Lah Douliazale - goalzz.com.
 Rida Lah Douliazale - mls-rumors.com.

References

Living people
1985 births
Moroccan footballers
Wydad AC players
Footballers from Casablanca
Kawkab Marrakech players
Association football midfielders
Morocco under-20 international footballers